Lawrence Ronald "Larry" Questad (July 10, 1943 – October 29, 2020) was a track and field athlete from the United States who specialized in sprinting events.

College career
He was a mediocre football and basketball player, but excelled at track at Park High School in Livingston, Montana. Questad went on to Stanford University, where he was the 1963 NCAA champion in the 100-yard dash sprint with a time of 9.7 seconds. Questad was a three-time All-American in the 100-yard dash, the 220, and the 440. His time in the 220, 20.74 seconds, remains the Stanford record, tied with James Lofton. He is a member of the school's Athletic Hall of Fame.

Olympics
Questad qualified for the 1968 Summer Olympics in the 200 meters and finished sixth in the final.

After track
Questad purchased Superior Steel, a supplier of bulk storage and transportation tanks in Caldwell, Idaho, in 1995 and ran the business until 2011, when he sold it to his sons.

Questad died in Boise, Idaho on October 29, 2020, following a lung infection and pneumonia.

References

1943 births
2020 deaths
People from Livingston, Montana
Stanford Cardinal men's track and field athletes
American male sprinters
Athletes (track and field) at the 1968 Summer Olympics
Olympic track and field athletes of the United States
20th-century American businesspeople
Track and field athletes from Montana